The railway station of Hillegom in the Netherlands is located on the railway line between Haarlem and Leiden.

The first railway station in the town was opened in 1891, closed in 1898 and torn down in 1900. A second railway station was opened on a different location in 1898, when the first was closed. It was designed by the architect D.A.N. Margadant. The freight tracks on the railway station were used to transport flowers from the nearby fields to i.a. the flower auction in Aalsmeer. During World War II, these tracks were used by the Germans, making it a prominent target for allied bombings. The passenger railway station was closed as a result of this on 17 September 1944. The freight tracks remained in use until the 1980s.

The railway station was reopened on 28 May 2000, on the same location as the second railway station.

Train services
, the following train services call at this station:
2x per hour local service (sprinter) The Hague - Leiden - Haarlem

External links
NS website 
Dutch Public Transport journey planner 
Stationsweb.nl - Station Hillegom

Railway stations in South Holland
Railway stations opened in 1898
Railway stations closed in 1944
Railway stations opened in 2000
Railway stations on the Oude Lijn
Hillegom